Events in the year 1885 in Brazil.

Incumbents
Monarch – Pedro II
Prime Minister – Manuel Pinto de Sousa Dantas (until 6 May), José Antônio Saraiva (from 6 May to 20 August), Baron of Cotegipe (starting 20 August)

Events
September 28 - Sexagenarian Law, or Saraiva-Cotegipe Law, which frees slaves over the age of 60.

Births

Deaths

References

 
1880s in Brazil
Years of the 19th century in Brazil
Brazil
Brazil